A white stag is a white stag or white deer.

White Stag may also refer to:

White Stag (Narnia), object of the final quest of the Kings and Queens of Narnia in the C.S. Lewis book The Lion, the Witch, and the Wardrobe
The White Stag, a children's short novel, recipient of the 1938 Newbery Medal
White Stag or Csodaszarvas of Hungarian mythology, a central figure in the origins of the Hungarian people
The White Stag group, mid-20th-century artist group in Ireland
White Stag Leadership Development Program, a junior leader training (JLT) program founded on the Monterey Peninsula, California
White Stag (clothing), a brand of clothing sold by Wal-Mart and a former sportswear manufacturer in Portland, Oregon
White Stag sign, an historic sign in Portland, Oregon, United States
White Hart, the personal badge of Richard II